The 2012 Malaysian motorcycle Grand Prix was the sixteenth round of the 2012 Grand Prix motorcycle racing season. It took place on the weekend of 19–21 October 2012 at the Sepang International Circuit. Sandro Cortese became the first Moto3 world champion.

Classification

MotoGP
The race was red-flagged due to the worsening weather conditions. The final results were taken at the end of the 13th lap and full points were awarded.

Moto2
The race was stopped with the red flag due to weather conditions. The final results were taken at the end of the 15th lap.

Moto3

Championship standings after the race (MotoGP)
Below are the standings for the top five riders and constructors after round sixteen has concluded.

Riders' Championship standings

Constructors' Championship standings

 Note: Only the top five positions are included for both sets of standings.

References

Malaysian motorcycle Grand Prix
Malaysia
Motorcycle Grand Prix
Malaysian motorcycle Grand Prix